Samuel Baños Cardín (born 16 August 1979), known simply as Samuel, is a Spanish former professional footballer who played as a midfielder, and is a current assistant manager of Sporting B.

Playing career
Samuel was born in Villaviciosa, Asturias. A product of Sporting de Gijón's youth system at Mareo, he spent the vast majority of his career in Segunda División, with Sporting, Real Murcia, Xerez CD, Levante UD, AD Alcorcón and CE Sabadell FC. He amassed totals of 271 matches and nine goals over 13 seasons in that tier, promoting to La Liga with the second and fourth clubs.

On 31 August 2012, aged 33, Samuel returned to the Segunda División B where he had already represented Sporting B the previous decade, signing for CD Atlético Baleares.

Coaching career
Samuel started his managerial career in 2017 as assistant coach of his hometown club CD Lealtad, and took the reins of the team the following year. They finished the season unbeaten, but could not achieve promotion from Tercera División after falling in the playoffs to Getafe CF B and CP Villarrobledo.

On 6 July 2019, Samuel was appointed at Sporting Gijón's reserves.

Managerial statistics

References

External links

1979 births
Living people
People from Villaviciosa, Asturias
Spanish footballers
Footballers from Asturias
Association football midfielders
Segunda División players
Segunda División B players
Tercera División players
Sporting de Gijón B players
Sporting de Gijón players
Real Murcia players
Xerez CD footballers
Levante UD footballers
AD Alcorcón footballers
CE Sabadell FC footballers
CD Atlético Baleares footballers
Caudal Deportivo footballers
Marino de Luanco footballers
Spain youth international footballers
Spanish football managers
Segunda División B managers
Tercera División managers